A dace is a small fish that can be one of many different species. The unmodified name is usually a reference to the common dace (Leuciscus leuciscus).  This, like most fish called "daces", belongs to the family Cyprinidae, mostly in subfamily Leuciscinae.

Daces in the Cyprinidae:
 Common dace, Leuciscus leuciscus
 Chinese mud carp, Cirrhinus chinensis (called "dace" in Hong Kong) or mud carp (Cirrhinus molitorella)
 Columbia River dace, Ptychocheilus oregonensis (a pikeminnow)
 Desert dace, Eremichthys acros (a monotypic genus)
 European daces, genus Leuciscus
 Fallfish, Semotilus corporalis (a creek chub called "dace" in Canada)
 Horned dace, Semotilus atromaculatus (a creek chub)
 Japanese dace Tribolodon hakonensis, genus Tribolodon
 Korean splendid dace, Coreoleuciscus splendidus (a monotypic genus)
 Lake Candidus dace, Candidia barbatus (a monotypic genus)
 Mexican daces, genus Evarra
 Moapa dace, Moapa coriacea (a monotypic genus)
 Northwest dace, Mylocheilus caurinus (a peamouth)
 Allegheny pearl dace, Margariscus margarita
 Northern pearl dace, Margariscus nachtriebi
 Ponto-Caspian daces, genus Petroleuciscus
 Redbelly daces, genus Phoxinus
 Redside daces, genus Clinostomus, e.g.
 Redside dace Clinostomus elongatus
 Rosyside dace Clinostomus funduloides
 Relict dace, Relictus solitarius (a monotypic genus)
 Riffle daces, genus Rhinichthys (including Tiaroga)
 Saskatchewan dace, Platygobio gracilis (a flathead chub)
 Shining dace, Semotilus corporalis (a creek chub)
 Spikedace, Meda fulgida (a monotypic genus)
 Spinedaces, genus Lepidomeda

Daces not in Cyprinidae
 Sea dace, the European seabass (Dicentrarchus labrax) of the Moronidae

Popular Culture
Dace are referenced in chapter three of George Orwell's novel Nineteen Eighty-Four: "Somewhere near at hand, though out of sight, there was a clear, slow-moving stream where dace were swimming in the pools under the willow trees."

The dace fish has also made an appearance in the Animal Crossing franchise, as well as Oregon Trail Settler.

See also
 Vendace (disambiguation)
 Chub (disambiguation)
 Minnow
 Roach (fish)
 Shiner (fish)

Fish common names
Former disambiguation pages converted to set index articles